James Gilmore Neher (February 5, 1889 – November 11, 1951) was a Major League Baseball pitcher who played for one season. He pitched in one game for the Cleveland Naps on September 10 during the 1912 Cleveland Naps season, pitching one inning.

External links

1889 births
1951 deaths
Major League Baseball pitchers
Cleveland Naps players
Baseball players from New York (state)
Sportspeople from Rochester, New York
Burials at Forest Lawn Cemetery (Buffalo)